The Four Just Men is a 1959 television series produced by Sapphire Films for ITC Entertainment. It was broadcast for one season of 39 half-hour monochrome episodes.

Plot
The series, based on a sequence of novels by Edgar Wallace including a 1905 novel titled The Four Just Men, presents the adventures of four men who first meet while Allied soldiers in Italy during the Second World War, tasked with the dangerous job to blow up a bridge behind enemy lines. In England in 1959 the men are contacted by telegram by their commanding officer, Colonel Cyril Bacon. to meet again. Col. Bacon died a week before, but has left a recorded message for the men. He has also left a will that his money be used by the four men to fight for justice and against tyranny. They operate from different countries: Jeff Ryder is a professor of law at Columbia University in New York City, Tim Collier is an American reporter based in Paris, Ben Manfred is a crusading independent MP who works from London, and Ricco Poccari is an Italian hotelier based in Rome. Their reputation as the "Four Just Men" is well known.

The series is unusual in having the four main actors appear alternately (except in the first episode); one or occasionally two makes a brief appearance in each other's episode, often using a telephone. This rolling format, which could be useful to the stars, was later borrowed by other US drama series particularly in the 1960s such as The Rogues (1964-5) and The Name of the Game (1968-1971).

Cast and characters

 Richard Conte as Jeff Ryder
 Dan Dailey as Tim Collier
 Jack Hawkins as Ben Manfred
 Vittorio De Sica as Ricco Poccari

Each character had an assistant:
 June Thorburn as Vicky, Ryder's law student assistant
 Honor Blackman as Nicole, Collier's French girlfriend and secretary
 Andrew Keir as Jock, Manfred's manservant and best friend
 Lisa Gastoni as Giulia, Poccari's secretary
 Robert Rietti as Francesco, Poccari's butler

Guest stars included Judi Dench, Alan Bates, Leonard Sachs, Patrick Troughton, Donald Pleasence, Richard Johnson, Ronald Howard, Basil Dignam, Roger Delgado, Charles Gray, and Frank Thornton (who appeared in more roles than anyone else).

Production
At the time, The Four Just Men was the most ambitious film series yet made for British TV. It was produced by Sapphire Films at Walton Studios, and on location in Britain, France, and Italy. None of its four stars had previously been cast as regulars in a television series. Indeed, only Dan Dailey would go on to another regular role on series television.

Filming of the 39 episodes, each 25 minutes long, began during January 1959, and lasted for five months, using up to seven units in the studio or on location, and producing two or three episodes simultaneously.

John Schlesinger was credited as exterior unit or second unit director on a number of episodes.

Episodes
Airdate is for ATV Midlands. ITV regions varied date and order.

Each story featured one star and, often, brief appearances by the others.
DD = Dan Dailey
JH = Jack Hawkins
RC = Richard Conte
VS = Vittorio De Sica

DVD
Network released the 39 episodes on August 13, 2010 in a five-DVD Region 2 set.

References

External links
 
 
 Dinosaur TV

1959 British television series debuts
1960 British television series endings
1950s British drama television series
1960s British drama television series
British crime television series
British drama television series
Television series by ITC Entertainment
ITV television dramas
Television shows based on British novels
English-language television shows
Black-and-white British television shows